The 264th Infantry Division was created at 20 May 1943 in Rouen. It was transferred to Yugoslavia in October 1943, where it was destroyed during the Battle of Knin in winter 1944/1945.

Commanding officers 
 Generalleutnant Albin Nake (1 June 1943 - 18 April 1944)
 Generalleutnant Otto-Joachim Lüdecke (18 April 1944 - 15 May 1944)
 General der Infanterie Martin Gareis (15 May 1944 - 25 September 1944)
 Generalmajor Paul Hermann (25 September 1944 - 9 October 1944)
 Generalmajor Alois Windisch (9 October 1944 - 5 December 1944 Division destroyed)

External links 
 "264. Infanterie-Division". German language article at www.lexikon-der-wehrmacht.de. Retrieved February 23, 2015.

Military units and formations established in 1943
Infantry divisions of Germany during World War II
1943 establishments in Germany
Military units and formations disestablished in 1945
Military units and formations of Germany in Yugoslavia in World War II